Emmanuel Mpawe Tutuba (born 30 March 1973) is the eight Governor of the Bank of Tanzania.

Early life and career
He completed his A-Levels in 1994 at Milambo Secondary School in Tabora Region having studied economics, geography and mathematics. From 1996 to 1999, he pursued his Advance Diploma in Economic Planning at the Institute of Development Studies at Mzumbe University; followed by an MBA in Corporate Management and graduating from the same alma mater in 2001.

In February 2020, President John Magufuli appointed him as the Regional Administrative Secretary (RAS) for Mwanza Region.

On 4 April 2021, he was appointed by President Samia Suluhu Hassan as the Permanent Secretary in the Ministry of Finance and Planning.

On 7 January 2023, he was appointed as the 8th Governor of Tanzania's central bank and was sworn in on 9 January 2023.

References

External links
Biography at the Ministry of Finance

Living people
1973 births
Governors of Bank of Tanzania
Mzumbe University alumni
Milambo Secondary School alumni